The Private Eye Blues is a 1994 Hong Kong crime film written, edited and directed by Eddie Fong and starring Jacky Cheung, Kathy Chow and Mavis Fan.

Cast
 Jacky Cheung as Private Eye
 Frankie Chin
 Chin Ho
 Kathy Chow as Private Eye's wife
 Mavis Fan as Kiddy
 Lee Hiu-tung as Daughter
 Wong Tin-lam as Manliand boss
 Bobby Yip as Guy bumped in the street

See also
Jacky Cheung filmography

External links

1994 films
1994 crime films
Hong Kong crime films
Hong Kong detective films
1990s Cantonese-language films
Films set in Hong Kong
Films shot in Hong Kong
1990s Hong Kong films